Primary elections for state and federal government offices were held in the Commonwealth of Pennsylvania on April 27, 2004.

Pennsylvania's general elections were then held on November 2, 2004.

President

Senator

Attorney General

Auditor General

State Treasurer

Pennsylvania State Senate

Pennsylvania House of Representatives

Ballot Question

References

 
Pennsylvania